Caffeate 3,4-dioxygenase is an enzyme that catalyzes the chemical reaction

3,4-dihydroxy-trans-cinnamate + O2  3-(2-carboxyethenyl)-cis,cis-muconate

Thus, the two substrates of this enzyme are 3,4-dihydroxy-trans-cinnamate (caffeic acid) and oxygen, whereas its product is 3-(2-carboxyethenyl)-cis,cis-muconate.

This enzyme belongs to the family of oxidoreductases, specifically those acting on single donors with O2 as oxidant and incorporation of two atoms of oxygen into the substrate (oxygenases). The oxygen incorporated need not be derived from O2.  The systematic name of this enzyme class is 3,4-dihydroxy-trans-cinnamate:oxygen 3,4-oxidoreductase (decyclizing). This enzyme participates in phenylpropanoid biodegradation.

References 

 

EC 1.13.11
Enzymes of unknown structure
Hydroxycinnamic acids metabolism